Limerick City was a constituency represented in the Irish House of Commons until 1800.

Members of Parliament
 1559 Edward Arthur and Clement Fanning
 1585 Thomas Arthur and Stephen White 
 1613 Sir Nicholas Arthur and James Galway 
 1634 Sir Geffrey Galwey, 1st Baronet and Dominick White 
 1639 Peter FitzAndrew Creagh and Dr Dominick FitzDavid White 
 1654 Protectorate Parliament - (Limerick City and Kilmallock) William Purefoy and Walter Waller 
 1658 Protectorate Parliament - (Limerick City and Kilmallock) Sir George Ingoldsby and Standish Hartstonge
 1661 Sir Standish Hartstonge, 1st Baronet and Gerald Fitzgerald

1689–1801

Notes

References

Historic constituencies in County Limerick
Constituencies of the Parliament of Ireland (pre-1801)
Politics of Limerick (city)
1800 disestablishments in Ireland
Constituencies disestablished in 1800